Kasandra Bradette (born October 10, 1989) is a Canadian short track speed skater. She has won world championship and World Cup medals.

Career

2018 Winter Olympics
In August 2017, Bradette was named to Canada's 2018 Winter Olympics team.

References

External links

1989 births
Living people
Canadian female speed skaters
Canadian female short track speed skaters
Olympic short track speed skaters of Canada
Short track speed skaters at the 2018 Winter Olympics
World Short Track Speed Skating Championships medalists
21st-century Canadian women